Latin American boy band CNCO has released four studio albums, one live album, three extended plays, thirty singles, including eight as a featured artist, and six promotional singles. The group released their debut single "Tan Fácil" in January 2016, which peaked at number 23 on Billboard's Hot Latin Songs chart. Later in May, they released "Quisiera", which reached number 29 on the chart. The band released their anticipated debut album, Primera Cita, on August 26 of the same year, which achieved a Gold certification in the U.S. The group gained international recognition after the release of their third single "Reggaetón Lento (Bailemos)". It has been certified 5× platinum in the Latin field of the Recording Industry Association of America (RIAA), and its video reached over 1 billion views in less than a year, making them the first boyband to achieve the feat.

In April 2017, they released "Hey DJ", the lead single from their sophomore album, featuring Yandel. Throughout the year they were featured in several singles and remixes from artists such as Río Roma and Becky G. Later in August, they collaborated with Little Mix on a remix of "Reggaetón Lento" released as the second single of the album, followed by "Mamita", released in October. The group released their self-titled album on April 6, 2018, accompanied by the fourth single "Sólo Yo". In July, they released "Se Vuelve Loca" as the fifth single from the album. The band released "Llegaste Tú", with Dominican-American singer Prince Royce in October, followed a month later by a remix of "Hey DJ", featuring American singer-songwriter Meghan Trainor and Jamaican artist Sean Paul. They released their first Spanglish solo single, "Pretend", on February 15, 2019. The group dropped "De Cero" in June as the lead single of their first EP, Que Quiénes Somos, which was released on August 11, 2019. In 2020, they released two singles,  and "Honey Boo" with Natti Natasha and "Beso". In November, they began the era of Déjà Vu, a cover and visual album of Latin pop classics recorded during quarantine due to the COVID-19 pandemic, with five official singles released from that month to February 2021. Following Joel Pimentel's departure in May 2021, they released their first song as quartet, "To'a la Noche" in August.

In January 2022, the group released "Party, Humo & Alcohol", their second song as a foursome, and in April, they released "La Equivocada", produced by Latin Grammy winner Edgar Barrera.

In September, while accepting the award for "Best Fandom" at the Premios Juventud ceremony, member Zabdiel de Jesús announced that the group would be disbanding in a year and a half. Their last album XOXO was released on August 26, the anniversary of their debut. The album includes singles released beforehand, such as “Plutón” with Kenia OS and “La Equivocada (Tumbado Version)” with Adriel Favela. The boyband will go on one final tour before their disbandment.

Albums

Studio albums

Live albums

Extended plays

Singles

As lead artist

As featured artist

Promotional singles

Guest appearances

Notes

References 

CNCO
Pop music group discographies
Latin pop music discographies
Discographies of American artists